Robert Longfield  (1810 – 27 April 1868) was an Irish barrister and a Conservative Party politician.

After unsuccessfully contesting  at the 1841 general election, Longfield was elected as the Member of Parliament (MP) for Mallow at the 1859 general election, and held the seat until 1865 when he did not seek re-election.

References

External links
 

1810 births
1868 deaths
Irish Conservative Party MPs
19th-century King's Counsel
Irish barristers
UK MPs 1859–1865
Members of the Parliament of the United Kingdom for County Cork constituencies (1801–1922)